Quinn Ngawati (born 15 June 1999) is a Canadian rugby union player currently playing for Rugby New York (Ironworkers) of Major League Rugby (MLR) in the U.S. 

He formerly represented the Toronto Wolfpack in the Betfred Super League, becoming the first Canadian-born player to play professional rugby league.

Background
Ngawati was born in Victoria, British Columbia, Canada. He is of Māori descent through his New Zealand born father. He is a graduate of the renowned boarding school, St. Michaels University School where he captained the school’s rugby team to a Provincial Championship.

Playing career

Rugby League
Ngawati has represented Canada at both rugby league and rugby union at age-grade level; playing league for the under-17 team and union for the under-19 team.

After attending a tryout for Toronto Wolfpack in Vancouver, Ngawati was one of three players to make the cut after attending the Wolfpack training camp in Brighouse, West Yorkshire, England.  His professional debut came in round 14 of the 2017 season when he came on as an interchange player in the 55th minute of the game against Gloucestershire All Golds. Ngawati made his debut for the Canadian national team on 16 September 2017, kicking 3 goals against the United States.

In March 2018, Ngawati was sent on loan, along with Wolfpack teammate Ryan Burroughs, to League 1 side London Skolars, for the remainder of the 2018 season.  Recalled by Toronto in June 2018 he made his final appearance for the Wolfpack against Featherstone Rovers on 23 July 2018.  In October 2018 it was announced that Ngawati was leaving the club and the sport to return to British Columbia to pursue a career in aviation.

In March 2020 he had a change of heart and returned to rugby league re-joining Toronto.

Rugby Union
On October 2, 2020, it was announced that he had switched codes to sign for Rugby United New York for the upcoming Major League Rugby season

References

External links
Toronto Wolfpack profile

1999 births
Living people
Canada national rugby league team players
Canadian expatriate sportspeople in England
Canadian people of New Zealand descent
Canadian rugby league players
Canadian rugby union players
London Skolars players
Rugby league centres
Rugby league second-rows
Rugby New York players
Sportspeople from Victoria, British Columbia
Toronto Wolfpack players
Canada international rugby union players
Rugby union centres
Rochdale Hornets players